The Convair 990 Coronado is an American narrow-body four-engined jet airliner produced between 1961 and 1963 by the Convair division of American company General Dynamics. This was still fewer passengers than the contemporary Boeing 707 (110 to 189) or Douglas DC-8 (105 to 173), although the 990 was  faster than either in cruise.

Design and development
American Airlines asked Convair to design an aircraft for coast-to-coast flights, able to fly nonstop from New York City to Los Angeles against the wind. They wanted a larger passenger capacity than the 880, which was the smallest of the first-generation U.S. jet airliners. It was known as the Convair 600 and was redesignated the Convair 990 in the month of its first flight. The 990 began flight testing on January 24, 1961.

One change from the 880 was the large anti-shock bodies on the upper trailing edge of the wings, to increase the critical Mach by reducing transonic drag. The inboard shock bodies, which were larger, were also used for additional fuel tankage. Later during the design period, Convair modified the design to include fuel in the outboard pods as well, but during the initial test flights the extra weight caused the outboard engines to oscillate in certain conditions. The inner set of pods were used to route the fuel-dump tubes from the fuel tanks, terminating in a prominent outlet.

The engines were also changed to the uprated General Electric CJ-805-23s, which were unique in that they used a fan stage at the rear of the engines, compared to the fan stage at the front of the engine found on the Pratt & Whitney JT3D that powered the 990's competitors. The engine was a simplified, non-afterburning civil version of the J79, used in supersonic military aircraft. Like most versions of the J79, the CJ805 and CJ805-23 were smoky, although secondary operator Spantax eventually had their engines refitted with low-smoke combustion chambers in the 1970s.

Like the 880, 990s incorporated a dorsal "raceway" added to the top of the fuselage to house the two ADF antennas and one VHF antenna.

Operational history
The 990 did not meet the specifications promised, and American Airlines reduced its order as a result. The 990A was developed by adding fairings to the engine nacelles, among other changes. Despite the modifications from the basic 880 and those in response to drag problems in testing, the aircraft never lived up to its promise of coast-to-coast nonstop capability from JFK to LAX. American Airlines' timetables show little or no difference in scheduled time between 707 and 990A flights.  AA began to dispose of its 990As in 1967.

During May 1961, one of the pre-production 990 aircraft, while demonstrating the margin between its operating speed and its capability during a dive at .97 Mach from 32,000 ft to 22,500 ft, reached  at an altitude of : the fastest true airspeed ever attained by a commercial jet transport at that time. However, in level flight the maximum speed, 0.84 Mn, was less than that guaranteed to American Airlines, 0.89 Mn, because the drag levels with the anti-shock bodies were much higher than predicted. A drag reduction program was instituted during which streamlining of the engine pylon/wing interface and addition of nacelle fairings achieved 0.89 Mn.

Swissair bought eight 990As beginning in 1962, operating them on long-distance routes to South America, West Africa, the Middle and Far East, as well as on European routes with heavy traffic. Their fleet was withdrawn from service in 1975. Scandinavian Airlines also operated Coronados on their long-haul schedules to Tokyo and other destinations in the Far East.

The 990's niche was soon captured by the Boeing 720 and Boeing 720B, derivatives of the Boeing 707, and later by the Boeing 727. By the time the assembly line shut down in 1963, only 37 990s had been produced, bringing General Dynamics' entire production of commercial jet airliners to 102 airframes. The failure of airlines to broadly accept the Convair 880 and 990 led Convair's parent company, General Dynamics, to suffer what at the time was one of the largest corporate losses in history. As a result, Convair exited the jet airliner business, although it later profitably built fuselages for the McDonnell Douglas DC-10, KC-10 and MD-11.

When the major airlines retired their Convair 990s, they found a second life on charter airlines. Spantax of Spain had a large fleet until the mid-1980s, as did Denver Ports of Call. In 1967, Alaska Airlines purchased Convair 990 PP-VJE from Varig, and operated it as N987AS in scheduled airline service until 1975.

Variants
 600 : Designation used for conception, design and build of first aircraft.
 990 : Initial production version.
 990A : Higher cruising speed and longer range.

Operators

 Aerolíneas Peruanas S.A.* - Aerolineas Peruanas operated two Convair 990As from Callao International Airport, Lima.
 Air Afrique
 Air Ceylon
 Air France (one aircraft leased in 1967)
 Alaska Airlines
 American Airlines*
 Aerovías Ecuatorianas
 Balair (leased from Swissair)
 Balkan Bulgarian Airlines
 Ciskei International Airways- no revenue flights made
 Christ is the Answer (leased from Galaxy Airlines)- no revenue flights made
 Denver Ports of Call
 El Al Israel Airlines
 Galaxy Airlines
 Garuda Indonesian Airways*
 Ghana Airways (leased from Swissair)
 Iberia Líneas Aéreas de España (leased from Spantax)
 Internord Aviation
 Lebanese International Airways
 Middle East Airlines
 Modern Air Transport
 NASA
 Nomads Travel Club
 Nordair
 Northeast Airlines
 Paradise 1000 Travel Club (leased from Modern Air Transport)
 Scandinavian Airlines System*
 Spantax
 Swissair*
 Thai Airways International (leased from Scandinavian Airlines System)
 VARIG* 

*Original operators.

Accidents and incidents
 May 28, 1968: Garuda Indonesian Airways Flight 892, a Convair 990 (PK-GJA), crashed minutes after takeoff from Bombay-Santacruz Airport, killing all 29 passengers and crew on board. One fatality also occurred on the ground.
 January 5, 1970: A Spantax Convair 990 (EC-BNM) crashed at Stockholm-Arlanda Airport outside Stockholm, Sweden while taking off on a three-engine ferry flight to Zürich, Switzerland, killing five of seven passengers; the three crew members survived.
 February 21, 1970: Swissair Flight 330 crashed near Würenlingen, Switzerland while trying to return to Zurich International Airport after a bomb detonated in the aft cargo compartment, killing all nine crew and 38 passengers. The aircraft was also carrying a significant amount of mail, some of which survived the crash.
 August 8, 1970: A Modern Air Transport Convair 990 (N5603) was being ferried from New York to Acapulco when it crashed on approach to Alvarez International Airport, Mexico. No one was killed, but one of the eight crew was badly injured.
 December 3, 1972: Spantax Flight 275, a Convair 990 (EC-BZR), crashed at Los Rodeos Airport on Tenerife while taking off in almost-zero visibility, killing all seven crew and 148 passengers.
 March 5, 1973: Spantax Flight 400, a Convair 990 on a flight from Madrid to London, was involved in a mid-air collision with Iberia Flight 504, a McDonnell Douglas DC-9, over Nantes. The Convair 990 lost part of its left wing, but its pilots managed to land safely at Cognac – Châteaubernard Air Base. The DC-9 crashed, killing all 68 passengers and crew on board.
 April 12, 1973: A U.S. Navy Lockheed P-3C (157332) operating from NAS Moffett Field in Sunnyvale, California collided with a NASA Convair 990 (N711NA) during approach to runway 32R. The aircraft crashed on the Sunnyvale Municipal Golf Course, half a mile short of the runway, resulting in the destruction of both aircraft and the deaths of all aboard except for one Navy crewman.
 July 17, 1985: A NASA Convair 990 (N712NA) suffered a blown tire during take-off at a speed of around 140 knots (259 km/h) at Riverside-March AFB, California. While attempting to clear the runway, the rim shattered and caused a puncture of the right-wing fuel tank forward of the right main gear. All 19 occupants survived, but the subsequent intense fire destroyed the plane, its equipment and documentation.

Surviving aircraft
 30-10-2  – N990AB – Aircraft (retired registration numbers N990AB, OB-R-765) been in storage since 1980 with Scroggins Aviation at the Mojave Air and Space Port in Mojave, California. This aircraft was formerly operated by Aérolíneas Peruanas.
 30-10-5  – N990AC – Cockpit (retired registration numbers N990AC, OB-R-728) that was stored in a scrapyard in Tucson, Arizona has been scrapped and turned into luggage tags. 
 30-10-12 – HB-ICC – Aircraft on display at the Swiss Museum of Transport in Lucerne, Switzerland. This aircraft was formerly operated by Swissair.
 30-10-18 – EC-BZP – Forward fuselage preserved at Sabadell Airport in Sabadell, Spain for cabin crew training. This aircraft was formerly operated by Spantax.
 30-10-29 – N810NA – Aircraft (retired registration numbers N810NA, N5617) on display as a gate guardian at Mojave Air and Space Port in Mojave, California. This aircraft was formerly operated by American Airlines, Modern Air Transport and NASA.
 30-10-30 – EC-BZO – Aircraft (retired registration numbers EC-BZO, N5618) in storage at Palma de Mallorca Airport in Palma, Majorca since 1987. This aircraft was formerly operated by Spantax.

Specifications (Convair 990A)

See also

References

Notes

Citations

Bibliography

 Gero, David. Aviation Disasters. Yeovil, Somerset, UK: Patrick Stephens Ltd (Haynes Publishing), 1997. .
 Green, William. Macdonald Aircraft Handbook. London. Macdonald & Co. (Publishers) Ltd., 1964.
 Proctor, Jon. Convair 880 & 990. Miami, Florida: World Transport Press, 1996. .
 Taylor, John W. R. Jane's All The World's Aircraft 1965-66. London: Samson Low, Marston, 1965.
 Wegg, John. General Dynamic Aircraft and their Predecessors. London: Putnam, 1990. .

External links

 Team Convair
 YouTube video of an American Airlines Convair 990

990
1960s United States airliners
Quadjets
Low-wing aircraft
Aircraft first flown in 1961